Jeffrey Ross Lifschultz (born September 13, 1965) is an American stand-up comedian and actor. He is best known as the "Roastmaster General" for his insult comedy, his multiple appearances at celebrity roasts held by the New York Friars Club, the Comedy Central Roast television series, and the Netflix historical comedy series Historical Roasts. In 2009 the Chicago Tribune called Ross "the new millennium Don Rickles." His directorial debut, the 2006 documentary Patriot Act: A Jeffrey Ross Home Movie, won the prize for Best Film at the Comedia film festival held at the Just for Laughs comedy festival in Montreal.

Early life
Ross was raised in Newark, New Jersey, until he was in second grade; then his family moved to Union, New Jersey, and later to Springfield, New Jersey, where he attended Jonathan Dayton High School. He is of Jewish heritage and has a younger sister named Robyn. His mother Marsha died from leukemia when he was 14 years old. His father died of drug-related causes when Ross was 19 years old and attending college. His father owned and ran Clinton Manor Catering, a business that was started by Ross's great-grandmother.  The business was located in Newark, and later moved to Union.

Ross attended Boston University as a broadcasting and film major with a minor in political science. He graduated from the Boston University College of Communication in 1987. Ross also worked as the music director at the university's student-run radio station WTBU in addition to working for the university's public radio station WBUR where he was an audio engineer.

Ross credits his tough upbringing in New Jersey for helping him develop his talent for insult comedy, which he says he developed as a defense mechanism. Ross stated in an interview with The Atlanta Constitution: "Everyone in my family was good at [roasting]. I had to quickly learn not just to take a joke but to give it back. My uncle Murray was the first to bust my chops. We called him mean Murray."

Career

Stand-up, writing and roast comedy
Ross began performing stand-up in 1989 after attending a comedy class. He appeared on A&E's An Evening at the Improv in 1994. By 1995 he was performing at iconic New York clubs like the Comedy Cellar and Stand Up NY. That same year he was invited by the New York Friars Club to participate in a roast of actor Steven Seagal.

Ross became a regular at the Friars Club roasts and was given the title of "Roastmaster General". The Friars Club's first televised event was the roast of Drew Carey that was broadcast on Comedy Central in 1998. Ross credits a particular joke that he made at the expense of attendees Bea Arthur and Sandra Bernhardt at the 1999 roast of Jerry Stiller for taking his roasting career to the next level. That same year Jimmy Kimmel hired Ross as a writer on The Man Show and Ross also wrote some of the punchlines for Billy Crystal's monologue at the Oscars in 2000.

In 2003 Comedy Central began producing their own celebrity roasts. Ross has been a roaster at all Comedy Central roasts since the 2005 roast of Pamela Anderson. During his Comedy Central Roast appearances Ross became known for dressing-up in edgy and sometimes controversial costumes: He roasted Charlie Sheen dressed as Muammar Gaddafi; he roasted Rob Lowe dressed as Purple Rain-era Prince on an episode that aired five months after the musician's death; he roasted Roseanne Barr dressed as the late football coach Joe Paterno during the height of the Penn State child sex abuse scandal; he also roasted James Franco wearing cornrows and a neck tattoo in reference to Franco's character in the 2012 film Spring Breakers.

Ross has participated as a roaster on the following Comedy Central Roasts: 

 Pamela Anderson (2005)
 William Shatner (2006)
 Flavor Flav (2007)
 Bob Saget (2008)
 Larry the Cable Guy (2009)
 Joan Rivers (2009)
 David Hasselhoff (2010)
 Donald Trump (2011)
 Charlie Sheen (2011)
 Roseanne Barr (2012)
 James Franco (2013)
 Justin Bieber (2015)
 Rob Lowe (2016)
 The Border (2017)
 Bruce Willis (2018)
 Alec Baldwin (2019)

Ross has also written for, performed in and/or produced the roasts of the following celebrities:

 Drew Carey (1998), produced by the New York Friars Club
 Jerry Stiller (1999), produced by the New York Friars Club
 Rob Reiner (2000), produced by the New York Friars Club
 Hugh Hefner (2001), produced by the New York Friars Club
 Carson Daly (2003), produced by MTV
 Gene Simmons (2008), produced by A&E
 Emmitt Smith (2008), produced by Shaquille O'Neal in the second installment of his TV series Shaq's All Star Comedy Roast
 Mike Greenberg and Mike Golic (aka Mike & Mike) (2008), produced by ESPN

Ross has taken part in several USO tours and has performed stand-up comedy at US Military bases in Afghanistan, Guantanamo Bay and Iraq. Ross first traveled to Iraq in 2003 as part of a comedy tour hosted by Drew Carey. In 2005 Ross released the film Patriot Act: A Jeffrey Ross Home Movie, which he both produced and directed and which documented his experiences on the Iraq tour. That same year the film won the prize for Best Film at the Comedia film festival, a comedy film festival held annually in Montreal as part of the Just for Laughs comedy festival. In 2006 the film was shown on Showtime and also screened at that year's South by Southwest Film Festival. In 2017 the USO made Ross the Ambassador of Veterans Outreach for the Artists & Athletes Alliance.

Ross published his first book, I Only Roast the Ones I Love: Busting Balls Without Burning Bridges, in 2009. The book recounts his journey to becoming Roastmaster General and includes tips on writing roast jokes and how to put on a roast.

Ross was the creator and host of the comedy panel show The Burn with Jeff Ross, which aired on Comedy Central for two seasons from 2012 to 2013.

In 2015, Ross starred in the Comedy Central special Jeff Ross Roasts Criminals: Live from Brazos County Jail, where he performed stand-up comedy for male and female convicts in Brazos County, Texas. The following year he released Jeff Ross Roasts Cops where he performed for members of the Boston Police Department.

Ross and comedian Brian Moses launched Jeff Ross Presents Roast Battle on Comedy Central in 2016. The show consists of comedians competing in one-on-one roast battles where the winners are decided by Ross and a panel of guest judges. Ross also appeared as a battler in final episode of the show's third season in a battle with NBA player Blake Griffin.

In 2018 Ross and fellow comedian Dave Attell embarked on their Bumping Mics comedy tour. Footage of their tour was also released in a three-part special, Bumping Mics with Jeff Ross & Dave Attell, on Netflix, the series was filmed during three of their performances at the Comedy Cellar in New York City. Their shows consisted of observational and political humor interspersed with Ross and Attell roasting one another as well as members of the audience. The comedians also invited audience members onto the stage, some of whom included Bob Saget, Gilbert Gottfried, Michael Che, Amy Schumer, Nikki Glaser and Paul Rudd.

Starting in 2019, Netflix began airing the series Historical Roasts, where Ross hosts fictionalized versions of comedy roasts for figures like Abraham Lincoln and Anne Frank.

Acting and voice work
One of Ross's first acting roles was a small part in the 1996 comedy film Celtic Pride. Some of his other film roles include a security guard the film Stuck on You (2003) and a wedding band leader in the film Along Came Polly (2004). Ross's television acting work includes roles on HBO's Six Feet Under and Crashing, and Showtime's Weeds. He also played a dramatic role on CBS's CSI.

Ross was co-creator of the satirical animated program Where My Dogs At? that was broadcast on MTV2 in 2006. The series centers around characters Buddy, a beagle voiced by Ross, and Woof, a bulldog voiced by Tracy Morgan. Ross has also voiced a characters on two episodes of the animated series Future-Worm! as well as on an episode of the live-action/animated series Happy! An animated version of Jeff Ross (voiced by Ross himself) appears in an episode of Batman: The Brave and the Bold that aired in 2012. During the episode his character attends a roast of Batman.

Other appearances as himself
Ross appeared in the 2005 documentary The Aristocrats about the famous dirty joke of the same name.

He was the guest on the debut episode of the WTF with Marc Maron podcast in 2009 and also appeared on the podcast's 800th episode in 2017.

Ross appeared in the third tournament of Celebrity Poker in 2004, but lost in his first match. He was also a competitor on the seventh season of Dancing with the Stars that aired in 2008. During rehearsal for their first dance, his dancing partner Edyta Śliwińska accidentally poked Ross in the eye, causing a scratched cornea. Against medical advice, Ross continued the competition, but the couple were the first to be eliminated.

In 2011 Ross visited the protesters of the Occupy movement in Los Angeles to support their cause. He took to the microphone at a stage set-up at Los Angeles City Hall. His talk included roasting Wall Street and the big banks.

In 2019, he appeared on an episode of Crank Yankers as himself.

Sexual misconduct allegation 
In June 2020, an allegation that Ross had engaged in a sexual relationship with a 15-year-old when he was 34 was published in the media; his accuser, Jessica Radtke, had also posted these allegations on her Facebook page in 2019. Ross denied the allegations. 

In November, Ross filed a defamation suit in the New York State Supreme Court, in which multiple named witnesses (including Radtke's father) refuted her allegations; Radtke was accused of extorting Ross for "significant sums of money".

Filmography

Film

Television

Discography
 No Offense (2008, Shout! Factory) – CD/DVD/Download

References

External links

 Jeff Ross at Comedy Hall of Fame Archives

1965 births
20th-century American comedians
21st-century American comedians
Jewish American comedy writers
American male film actors
American male television actors
American male voice actors
American stand-up comedians
American television writers
Boston University College of Communication alumni
Comedians from New Jersey
Jewish American male comedians
Jewish American male actors
Jonathan Dayton High School alumni
Living people
Male actors from New Jersey
New Jersey Democrats
Participants in American reality television series
People from Springfield Township, Union County, New Jersey
Screenwriters from New Jersey
American male television writers
21st-century American Jews